The Canton of Saint-Étienne-du-Rouvray is a canton situated in the Seine-Maritime département and in the Normandy region of northern France.

Geography 
An area of quarries, forestry and light industry, situated on the left bank of the Seine immediately south of Rouen city centre. The altitude varies from 2m to 128m at (Oissel) with an average altitude of 22m.

Composition 
Since the French canton reorganisation which came into effect in March 2015, the canton consists of the following communes:
 Oissel
 Saint-Étienne-du-Rouvray (partly)

Population

See also 
 Arrondissements of the Seine-Maritime department
 Cantons of the Seine-Maritime department
 Communes of the Seine-Maritime department

References

Saint-Etienne-du-Rouvray